Roberta Karlsson och kungen is a 1983 Viveca Sundvall children's book in the Mimmi series. Written as a diary, it is set between 8 June-16 July the year Mimmi has summer vacation between first and second grade. Together with En ettas dagbok and Vi smyger på Enok they were later all released in a collection called "Mimmis bok".

Plot
During her first summer holiday, Mimmi travels Norrland. At Albin, her uncle at her mother's side, she meets Lasse. In Gothenburg Roberta Karlsson states that she has met the king of Sweden.

References

Mimmis bok, Viveca Sundvall, Rabén & Sjögren, 1986

1983 children's books
Works by Viveca Lärn
1983 Swedish novels
Fictional diaries